The long-tailed myna (Mino kreffti) is a member of the starling family. It is native to the Bismarck and Solomon archipelagos. It resembles the yellow-faced myna, and the two were formerly considered conspecific.

Its binomial name commemorates Gerard Krefft, Australian zoologist and palaeontologist.

Description
Going on standard measurements and length, this very large myna is one of the largest member of the diverse family Sturnidae, behind only perhaps the Nias hill myna. It measures  in length. No known weights have been reported. These measurements are just slightly larger on average than the closely related yellow-faced myna and indicate the species is around three times as massive as the common starling. The long-tailed myna mainly has purple-glossed black plumage. It has bright orange-yellow patches of naked skin around each eye. It has a yellow lower belly and white wing patches, which are obvious in flight. The rump and undertail are white and the strong bill is bright yellow.

Behaviour
The long-tailed myna nests in tree holes, often in palms. The eggs are pale blue with delicate reddish or grey markings.

This myna is arboreal, and is found alone or in pairs in open lowland forests and plantations. It feeds mainly on fruits and berries. It is a conspicuous and vocal species with a wide range of whistles and squawks.

References

long-tailed myna
Birds of the Bismarck Archipelago
Birds of the Solomon Islands
long-tailed myna
long-tailed myna